Elections to the Provincial Assembly of Balochistan were held in 1993.

Results

Further reading

References 

Elections in Balochistan
1993 elections in Pakistan